Kozlovia is a genus of flowering plants belonging to the family Apiaceae.

Its native range is Afghanistan to Central Asia (Kyrgyzstan, Tajikistan, Turkmenistan and Uzbekistan) and Pakistan..

Taxonomy
The genus name Kozlovia is in honour of Pyotr Kozlov (1863–1935), a Russian and Soviet traveller and explorer who continued the studies of Nikolai Przhevalsky in Mongolia and Tibet. The genus was first described in 1904.

A 2001 study using ribosomal DNA found that Neoconopodium, Krasnovia and Kozlovia were closely related within tribe Scandiceae subtribe Scandicinae, and proposed that they be combined into Kozlovia. , this proposal had been accepted by the Germplasm Resources Information Network, but not by Plants of the World Online.

Species
Known species, according to Kew:
Kozlovia laseroides 
Kozlovia paleacea

References

Apioideae
Plants described in 1904
Flora of Central Asia
Flora of Afghanistan
Flora of Pakistan
Apioideae genera